Southwater was a railway station on the Steyning Line which served the village of Southwater. A goods siding allowed for the transportation of coal and other raw materials to and from Southwater Brickworks.

The station closed as a result of the Beeching Axe in 1966, the station demolished and the site covered with housing development. West Sussex County Council had previously owned the site of the former railway station (as well as the trackbed) but, with the growth of the Village and the need for a library and police service, the County Council sold the land to Horsham District Council for a price of up to £1.3 million so that these facilities could be provided. The subsequent development required the re-alignment of Worthing Road which was previously carried over the railway line by a bridge. This section was closed and a new road now cuts through the heart of the former station site. The local parish council have erected a replica station sign in the vicinity.

See also 

 List of closed railway stations in Britain

References 

Disused railway stations in West Sussex
Railway stations in Great Britain opened in 1861
Railway stations in Great Britain closed in 1966
Beeching closures in England
1861 establishments in England
Former London, Brighton and South Coast Railway stations